HMS Deux Amis was the French privateer schooner Deux Amis, launched in 1796. The British captured her in December 1796 and the Royal Navy took her into service under her existing name. She made one capture before wrecking in May 1799.

Capture, career, and fate

Deux Amis arrived at Cork on 1 January 1797 and was registered on 16 March. Master J. Watson commissioned her in February. She underwent fitting at Portsmouth from May to September 1798.

Master Samuel Willson took command in May 1798. In November Deux Amis captured the Spanish snow African Packet. African Packet was carrying silver, which Willson placed in the hands of the firm of Marsh and Creed, London, for onward  transfer to the Registry of the High Court of Admiralty.

Deux Amis wrecked on the night of 23–24 May 1799 on the back of the Isle of Wight; her passengers and crew were saved. She was sailing from Jersey to Portsmouth when on the night of the 23rd she struck a sunken rock at Grange Chine. She had as passengers Lieutenants d'Auvergne and Lemprière, and Matthew Gosset, Viscount of Jersey.

Deux Amis left Jersey on 23 May 1799 and at 3:30 in the morning she hit a rock. Despite efforts to save her, water entered the ship faster than the pumps could remove it. After the passengers left in a boat, Willson decided to run her ashore, which he did. As a result, there were no casualties. While Deux Amis was in distress at sea, local fishing boats came to help; once she ran ashore, the local populace gave priority to plundering rather than rescue. When Captain Green of the North Hants militia heard what was happening, he and his officers sent a strong detachment to enforce order.

Notes

Citations

References
 
 

Schooners of the Royal Navy
Captured ships
Privateer ships of France
1796 ships
Maritime incidents in 1799
Shipwrecks in the English Channel